Anne de Mowbray, 8th Countess of Norfolk, later Duchess of York and Duchess of Norfolk (10 December 1472 – c. 19 November 1481) was the child bride of Richard of Shrewsbury, Duke of York, one of the Princes in the Tower. She died at the age of eight.

Heiress
She was born at Framlingham Castle in Suffolk, the only (surviving) child of John de Mowbray, 4th Duke of Norfolk and Lady Elizabeth Talbot. Her maternal grandparents were John Talbot, 1st Earl of Shrewsbury and his second wife Lady Margaret Beauchamp. The death of her father in 1476 left Anne a wealthy heiress.

Marriage
On 15 January 1478, aged 5, she was married in St Stephen's Chapel, Westminster, to Richard of Shrewsbury, Duke of York, the 4-year-old younger son of King Edward IV and his queen, Elizabeth Woodville.

Death and heirs
Anne died at Greenwich in London, nearly two years before her husband disappeared into the Tower of London with his older brother, Edward V. Upon her death, her heirs normally would have been her cousins, William, Viscount Berkeley and John, Lord Howard, but by an act of Parliament in January 1483 the rights were given to her husband Richard, with reversion to his descendants, and, failing that, to the descendants of his father Edward IV.

Burial
Anne was buried in a lead coffin in the Chapel of St. Erasmus of Formia in Westminster Abbey. When that chapel was demolished in about 1502 to make way for the Henry VII Lady Chapel, Anne's coffin was moved to a vault under the Abbey of the Minoresses of St. Clare without Aldgate, run by nuns of the Order of Poor Clares Franciscans. Her coffin eventually disappeared.

In December 1964, construction workers in Stepney accidentally dug into the vault and found Anne's coffin. It was opened, and her remains were analysed by scientists and then entombed in Westminster Abbey in May 1965. Her red hair was still on her skull and her shroud was still wrapped around her. Westminster Abbey is the presumed resting place of her husband, Richard Duke of York, and his brother Edward V, in the Henry VII Chapel.

Family

Ancestors

Family tree

Notes

References
 
P. M. Kendall, The World of Anne Mowbray, Observer Colour Magazine, issued 23 May 1965

Sources
M. A. Rushton, The Teeth of Anne Mowbray, British Dental Journal, issued 19 October 1965
Stepney Child Burial, Joint press release from the London Museum and Westminster Abbey, issued 15 January 1965
Roger Warwick, Skeletal Remains of a Medieval Child, London Archaeologist, Vol. 5 No. 7, issued summer 1986

1472 births
1481 deaths
People from Framlingham
Anne de Mowbray, 8th Countess of Norfolk
15th-century English people
15th-century English women
English princesses
Daughters of English dukes
Wives of knights
Anne de Mowbray
Hereditary women peers
Duchesses of York
8th Countess of Norfolk
Barons Mowbray
12
Earls of Norfolk (1477 creation)
Anne
Royalty and nobility who died as children